The Turgay Plateau (Torğai Üstırtı) is a plateau in north-west Kazakhstan, central Asia. It lies 200–300 m above sea level.

It extends some 630 km north–south and 300 km east–west.  It is bisected by the Turgay Depression which is 800 km long and during the last ice age provided an outlet for the extinct West Siberian Glacial Lake.

Between the Cretaceous and Eocene, the plateau was part of the Turgai Straits or West Siberian Sea, an extension of the Tethys Sea that separated Asia from Europe.

References 
 Bookrags.com description

Plateaus of Kazakhstan
Plateaus of Asia